Kingdom Come: The Final Victory is the sixteenth and final book of the Left Behind series, released on Tuesday, April 3, 2007. It takes place from the day after the Glorious Appearing to the last day of the Millennium.

Plot summary

Just after the Glorious Appearing
In the aftermath of the Glorious Appearing during the 75 Day Interval before the Millennium World, Cameron (formerly known as Buck) and Chloe Williams see their son Kenny playing with other children who were orphaned during the Tribulation. Buck and Chloe form a ministry known as Children of the Tribulation (COT), in the knowledge that these must be brought to a saving knowledge of Jesus Christ before their one-hundredth year, or they shall die and go to hell. At the End of the 75 Day Interval, Christ destroys the rebuilt Temple of Jerusalem with lightning from Heaven. He then constructs a new Temple for the people of the Earth and sets up Levites as his priests and his earthly apostles as civil governors, with a resurrected King David as their chief. Meanwhile, Natural and Glorified Believers (Naturals being believers who lived to see the Glorious Appearing, and will still age slowly until the end of the Millennium, but not die; Glorified being believers who were raptured or died during the Tribulation and received Glorified Bodies, meaning they cannot age or die.) begin building their Houses and Estates for the 1,000 Years.

Ninety-three years into the Millennium
A young woman named Cendrillon dies at age 100, surprising the Williams' and their close friends, who employed her at COT and assumed that she was saved. Rumors surface that she may have had contact with a group called The Other Light (TOL), which defies Christ even after his appearing and is growing in the world outside the Kingdom.  This seems confirmed when Kenny Williams speaks to Cendrillon's cousins at the funeral, and sees that they wear garments announcing their dedication to TOL.  The former members of the Tribulation Force decide to redouble their efforts in their new ministries, and Kenny Williams joins Raymie Steele and Abdullah's two children to form the Millennium Force, dedicated to share the Gospel to unsaved children before they turn a century old. Meanwhile, Kenny is introduced to a Natural Believer from Greece around his age named Ekaterina Risto, who is employed at COT. The Two strike up a friendship, before beginning a romantic relationship.

Kenny tries to go undercover and infiltrate TOL, but his plans fall through when his older believing friend Abdullah Ababneh mistakenly thinks he is really a member of TOL. This causes Kenny's life to virtually fall apart, as his girlfriend Ekaterina deserts him, all his friends abandon him, and even his own parents can hardly seem to believe him. Ekaterina soon feels guilty and talks to Kenny, and they discover the real infiltrator from TOL, another teenager named Qasim Marid. Qasim is fired and Kenny is reunited with his girlfriend and his family. Kenny eventually marries Ekaterina, and they produced 8 Sons and 6 Daughters and over 80 Grandchildren, before expanding the work of COT to Greece, until they were too old to carry on and went back to Jerusalem towards 3/4 of the way through the Millennium.

Meanwhile, Rayford Steele and his first wife Irene, now in a glorified body, lead a missionary trip to Egypt.  Tsion Ben-Judah stands before the Parliament and rebukes the people of that land for continuing to glorify the name of the Egyptian god Ptah in the very name of their country and then renames the country Osaze.  They preach the Gospel and lead many to salvation, but Rayford is captured by a pocket of resistance with goals similar to TOL. He experiences firsthand the power of God when an angel descends into the base and rescues him and his fellow prisoners. Rayford also leads a TOL operative named Rehema to salvation.

Near the end of the Millennium, the ministry is taken over mainly by Believers in Glorified Bodies (like Cameron, Chloe, Irene, Raymie, Tsion Ben-Judah and Bruce) as the Naturals from the Beginning of the Tribulation begin to feel the ravages of time. Friends and family gather at COT to celebrate the thousandth birthday of Mac McCullum, and every member of what was once the Tribulation Force makes an appearance. Rayford, who is now more than 1,000 years old, requests a picture of the original Tribulation Force, and is shocked to find how old he looks in contrast to his daughter Chloe, son-in-law Cameron and friend Bruce Barnes (who are all in glorified bodies).

Homecoming
In the final years of the Millennium, the Other Light amasses its armies, a force a thousand times larger than the Global Community Unity Army that were present at the Battle of Armageddon 1,000 years before. All the billions of members of TOL gather all the weapons they can to battle against God, surrounding the city of Jerusalem during the final year of the Millennium where Christ reigns, with Lucifer himself leading their charge during the final day when he is released. However, Jesus comes out to meet them and says, "I Am Who I Am," and the entire opposing army is devoured by fire. Jesus then speaks personally to Lucifer, shaming him for his iniquities and evils. At his final words he opens a hole to the Lake of Fire in spacetime itself in which the Beast (Nicolae Carpathia) and the False Prophet (Leon Fortunato), are seen both writhing in agony and screaming "Jesus is Lord!" Lucifer joins them in their screaming and is thrown into torment with them. All the Believers at the End of the Millennium are then taken to Heaven, with the Naturals finally becoming Glorified. The Great White Throne Judgment takes place and all unbelievers are cast into the lake of fire. The earth is destroyed and reduced to particles by fire from Heaven and from inside the Earth itself. After the Great White Throne Judgement, Jesus instantly creates a new earth, and Heaven (or New Jerusalem) descends down upon it, ushering in a new heaven and a new earth. All the believers are then welcomed into New Jerusalem and New Earth, destined to reign with Christ for all eternity.

External links
Kingdom Come: The Final Victory from tyndale.com 
LeftBehind.com

2007 American novels
Left Behind series
Fiction about the Devil
Novels set in Egypt
Novels set in Greece
Novels set in Jerusalem
Novels set in Israel